was an admiral in the Imperial Japanese Navy during World War II.

Biography
Jōjima was from Saga Prefecture. He was a graduate of the 40th class of the Imperial Japanese Naval Academy in 1912, where he placed 111th out of 144 cadets. He served as midshipman on the cruiser  and battlecruiser . After being commissioned as ensign, he was assigned to the battlecruiser  and then , and then back to Ikoma.

On 17 April 1941, he became captain of the aircraft carrier .

Jōjima was still captain of Shōkaku during the attack on Pearl Harbor, the Battle of Rabaul, the Indian Ocean Raid, Operation Mo, the Battle of the Coral Sea.

Jōjima was promoted to rear admiral on 1 May 1942. As commander of naval aviation units throughout the war, he also led the seaplane tenders of R-Area Air Force that participated in the defense of Guadalcanal during the Guadalcanal campaign including the Battle of Cape Esperance and Japanese efforts to recapture Henderson Field in 1942.

Surviving the war, Jōjima died in 1967.

Notes

References

Books

Rekishi Dokuhon Vol. 33, Document of the war No. 48 Overview of Imperial Japanese Navy Admirals, Shin-Jinbutsuoraisha Co., Ltd., Tōkyō, Japan, 1999, .
The Maru Special, Ushio Shobō (Ushioshobokojinsha Co., Ltd.), Tōkyō, Japan.
Japanese Naval Vessels No. 6, Aircraft carrier Shōkaku / Zuikaku, 1976.
Japanese Naval Vessels No. 16, Aircraft carrier Ryūjō / Hōshō, 1978.
Japanese Naval Vessels No. 23, Japanese aircraft carriers I, 1979.
Japanese Naval Vessels No. 34, Japanese auxiliary vessels, 1979.

External links

 - somewhat inaccurate on details, since it was written during the war
 - Copy of the commander of U.S. Destroyer Squadron 12's after action report.

1890 births
1967 deaths
People from Saga Prefecture
Japanese admirals of World War II
Imperial Japanese Navy admirals